Sanjay Gandhi Thermal Power Plant is located at Birsinghpur in Umaria district of Madhya Pradesh, India. The power plant is one of the Coal-fired power station of MPPGCL

Power plant
Sanjay Gandhi Thermal Power Station has an installed capacity of 1340.00 MW. The First unit was commissioned in March 1993.
The Water for the plant has been procured from nearby Johila Dam which is spread across 1810 Hectares.
The coal for the plant has been procured by Rail from South eastern Coal Fields.

Installed capacity

Commercial Monitoring Cell
Sanjay Gandhi Thermal Power Station has a Commercial Monitoring Cell which commercially monitors the Profit as well as the Losses of the Power Plant. In order to Automate the work and to compete in the Real Time World with the Deviation Settlement Mechanism of India incorporated by CERC an In-House Commercial Monitoring Software has been developed which shows the Profit/Loss in Real-Time .

Deviation Settlement Mechanism
The Commercial Monitoring Software is designed with respect to the Rules & Regulations of Deviation Settlement Mechanism formed by CERC and a DSM Calculator (Open Access) for offline DSM Calculation (Block-Wise) is also provided at http://dsm.mppgcl.org/calculator

Average Grid Frequency
Sanjay Gandhi Thermal Power Station is the first power station to provide Moving Average Frequency of running block (Open Access) which is required for calculation of deviation charges of that block  at http://dsm.mppgcl.org/freq

See also 

 Satpura Thermal Power Station
 Amarkantak Thermal Power Station
 Shree Singaji Thermal Power Station

References 

SGTPS Registration Form

Coal-fired power stations in Madhya Pradesh
Umaria district
1993 establishments in Madhya Pradesh
Energy infrastructure completed in 1993
20th-century architecture in India